Banceuy Prison was a prison located in Bandung, West Java, Indonesia. 

Banceuy Prison was built in 1877 by colonial government. It is located in Banceuy Street, 500 meters to the west of Merdeka Building-Asian-African Conference Museum complex.

References
Footnotes

Bibliography

Buildings and structures in Bandung
Government buildings completed in 1877
Prisons in Indonesia
1877 establishments in the Dutch East Indies